The Houston Film Critics Society Award for Best Screenplay is an annual award given by the Houston Film Critics Society.

Winners

2000s

2010s

2020s

References
 Houston Film Critics Society official website

Houston Film Critics Society
Screenwriting awards for film